Safa Kasap is a professor and an electrical engineer at the University of Saskatchewan. He was named a Fellow of the Institute of Electrical and Electronics Engineers (IEEE) in 2015 for his contributions to photoconductive sensors for x-ray imaging.

References

Fellow Members of the IEEE
Living people
Year of birth missing (living people)
Place of birth missing (living people)
Academic staff of the University of Saskatchewan
Fellows of the American Physical Society